Mario Bahamonde Silva (1910–1979) was a Chilean poet, critic, short story writer and teacher. He was born in Taltal. He was the rector of the Liceo de Antofagasta. He was recognized as a key literary figure in the north of Chile, and wrote several books about the region and its arts and culture.

He died in Antofagasta.

Selected works

References

1910 births
1979 deaths
20th-century Chilean novelists
20th-century Chilean poets
20th-century Chilean short story writers
20th-century Chilean male writers
Chilean male poets
Chilean male novelists
Chilean male short story writers
Chilean essayists